T·O·S (Terminate on Sight) is the second and final studio album by rap group G-Unit. It was the group's first album in five years since their previous album, Beg for Mercy. The title of the album was originally announced to be Shoot to Kill and then Lock & Load, with the eventual name being Terminate on Sight. The album was originally scheduled to be released on June 24, 2008, but was rescheduled to July 1.

Concept 
The album's title has been acknowledged by HipHopDX who said "As the title suggests, they aren't exactly aiming for joy." In an interview with MTV, Tony Yayo revealed the reason behind the title saying that it "describes the aggressiveness."

50 Cent commented on the method of songwriting and recording that the group are using. He said: 

In another interview with MTV, 50 Cent spoke about the album. He said: 

In an interview, Lloyd Banks talked about the album, calling it "aggressive" and a "good album for hip-hop".

Music

Recording 
During an interview, Spider Loc mentioned that G-Unit had recorded seventy to eighty tracks which could have appeared on the album.
However, in a later interview with AllHipHop.com, G-Unit stated that there were eighteen possible tracks which could have made the final album.

In an interview with MTV, 50 Cent spoke about the steps before release. He said: 

In an interview with ReverbNation, Lloyd Banks commented on the work ethic whilst recording the album. He said: 

In an interview, Tony Yayo spoke about a track featuring Eminem, which is produced by Dr. Dre. He said:  However this did not materialize.

Production 
Tony Yayo stated that the Timbaland and Swizz Beatz tracks are his "favourites", quoting them as "the standout tracks". Tony Yayo has also confirmed that Ron Browz has produced for the album.
In an interview with HipHopGame, G-Unit also stated that production was provided by some relatively new producers.

Reception 

T.O.S: Terminate on Sight received mixed reviews from music critics. At Metacritic, it has been given a score of 45 out of 100 based on 10 "mixed or average reviews".

The track "Straight Outta Southside" is a tribute to Sean Bell who was killed by police in New York City. The song features elements from N.W.A's track entitled "Straight Outta Compton".

AllHipHop noted the aggressiveness on "Straight Outta Southside" quoting Lloyd Banks' lines:  They also called "Kitty Kat" and "I Like the Way She Do It" "Down right awful". AllMusic praised the lyrics on the album citing lyrics from the track "Piano Man":  They also positively commented on Tony Yayo's style saying "Yayo has never sounded so good, stepping his game up with a faster and more urgent style dropping wittier lines", citing his lyrics on the title track, "I kick Game like Pele and Beckham".

ReverbNation have noted that "No Days Off" features a funky 1964 style baseline whilst maintaining the use of synthesized effects and have described it as "Instant riding music". Similarly, they have said that "Kitty Kat" features an "irresistible island-flavored flow" whilst "The Piano Man" is dark and sardonic. MTV stated that "The Party Ain't Over" is reminiscent of "I Get Money", and denounces talk of the group's demise.

HipHopDX gave the album 2/5 calling "I Like the Way She Do It" "nothing short of embarrassing" Nevertheless, they praised several tracks, calling "You So Tough" "easily the best track on the album" and praising "I Don't Wanna Talk About It" for its "Dope production". They also commented on the track "Ready Or Not" calling it "nice and menacing" and "the way the album should sound". UGO gave it a B and called it "a satisfying G-Unit release." Okayplayer gave it a favorable review and said, "The album lacks the soul and introspection that endear audiences to even the most hardened villain. There’s no remorse here; no second guessing themselves. Just day in, day out thugging, slinging, shooting and screwing. The members of G-Unit have elected to portray themselves as inhumane to the nth degree. And for the opportunity, they’d like to thank God." Artistdirect gave it four stars out of five and said, " G-Unit have effectively found the balance between sex and war, and they're about [to] terminate the competition with extreme prejudice."

IGN gave it a 7.6 out of 10 and said that the group did a "stellar job of picking beats" DefSounds gave the album a 7.5 out of 10 and praised all its aspects, agreeing with IGN and calling the production "up tempo, gritty, rough but enjoyable" and commenting on the lyrics saying "the constant subliminals, catchy punchlines and the funny insults add to the enjoyment of the album". They note that the same subject matter is used throughout the album, however, saying the combination of "hot production, witty lyrics and constant disses" makes the tough talk "a success". They concluded by saying

Commercial performance
T·O·S (Terminate on Sight) debuted at number four on the US Billboard 200 with sales of 102,000 copies in its first week.

Tracks listing 
Credits adapted from the album's liner notes.

 Young Buck is credited as a featured artist as he was not a G Unit member anymore at the time of the album's release.

Credited samples 
 "You So Tough" - Contains elements from "Pahle, Pahle Pyar Ki Mulaqaten" (Bakshi/Burman). Saregama Music United States BMI (admin by the Royalty Network, Inc.) Used by permission. Performed by Bappi Lahiri and Anjaan. Used courtesy of Saregama, Ltd by arrangement with The Royalty, Inc.
 "No Days Off" - Contains elements from "On N Oublie Jamias" aka "Dawn Of Our Love" (Ahlert/Massoulier/Pop) EMI Blackwood Music, Inc./Bagtelle Societe (BMI). Used by permission. Performed by Herb Ohta & His Orchestra. Used courtesy of Universal Music Enterprises.
 "Let It Go" - Contains elements from "Preciso Me Encontrar" (Filho). Universal Music-MGB Songs (ASCAP). Used by permission. Performed by Cartola. Used courtesy of EMI Brazil Records, Under license from EMI Music Marketing.
 "Get Down" - Contains elements from "Spinning Wheel" (Clayton-Smith). EMI Blackwood Music, Inc./Bay Music, Inc. (BMI). Used by permission. Performed by Blood, Sweat & Tears. Used courtesy of Sony BMG Music Entertainment.

Personnel 
 Producers – Swizz Beatz, Ron Browz, Tha Bizness, Rick Rock, Ty Fyffe, Polow da Don, Don Cannon, Jake One,Special Edition DVD Edited by Timothy "cyphaman" Hannah Jr. Dangerous LLC, Dual Output, Ky Miller, Street Radio, Damien Taylor
 Mixing – Pat Viala, Steve Baughman
 Guitar/bass – Daniel Groover

Charts

Weekly charts

Year-end charts

References

External links
 
 T.O.S: Terminate on Sight Stream

Albums produced by Hit-Boy
Albums produced by Polow da Don
Albums produced by Rick Rock
Albums produced by Swizz Beatz
Albums produced by Tha Bizness
Albums produced by Jake One
Albums produced by Don Cannon
G-Unit albums
G-Unit Records albums
Interscope Records albums
2008 albums